Philodoria basalis is a moth of the family Gracillariidae. It was first described by Lord Walsingham in 1907. It is endemic to the Hawaiian islands of Maui and Hawaii.

The larvae feed on Metrosideros species. They mine the leaves of their host plant. The larvae emerge from the mine to form an oval cocoon, which is located on the outer surface of the dead epidermis of the leaf covering the larval mine. The epidermis is cut around at a slight distance from the cocoon so that it falls easily out of the leaf carrying the cocoon with it.

External links

Philodoria
Endemic moths of Hawaii
Taxa named by Thomas de Grey, 6th Baron Walsingham
Moths described in 1907